West Long Branch is a borough in Monmouth County, New Jersey, United States. As of the 2010 United States Census, the borough's population was 8,097, reflecting a decline of 161 (−1.9%) from the 8,258 counted in the 2000 Census, which had in turn increased by 568 (+7.4%) from the 7,690 counted in the 1990 Census. It is the home of Monmouth University.

History
Prior to being called West Long Branch, the area had been called Mechanicsville from the 18th century through the Civil War, and then Branchburg in the 1870s. The name West Long Branch appears in the 1889 Wolverton Atlas of Monmouth County, and seems to have derived its name from its proximity to a section of the Shrewsbury River.

In 1908, the residents of what was the West Long Branch section of Eatontown thought that they were not getting a fair return on their taxes. A request was made that the West Long Branch section be separated from Eatontown. The Township of Eatontown strongly resisted as there were several large estates in the West Long Branch section that were a source of considerable taxes. An act of the New Jersey Legislature was passed on April 7, 1908, and the Monmouth County Board of Chosen Freeholders authorized an election. On May 5, 1908, the referendum was held in West Long Branch, with voters approving the separation. The borough takes its name from Long Branch, which in turn takes its name from the "long branch" or south branch of the Shrewsbury River.

Geography

According to the United States Census Bureau, the borough had a total area of 2.89 square miles (7.49 km2), including 2.86 square miles (7.40 km2) of land and 0.04 square miles (0.09 km2) of water (1.25%).

Unincorporated communities, localities and place names located partially or completely within the borough include Norwood Park.

The borough borders the Monmouth County municipalities of Eatontown, Long Branch, Ocean Township and Oceanport.

Demographics

Census 2010

The Census Bureau's 2006–2010 American Community Survey showed that (in 2010 inflation-adjusted dollars) median household income was $96,369 (with a margin of error of +/− $15,449) and the median family income was $114,250 (+/− $13,662). Males had a median income of $75,634 (+/− $8,441) versus $49,483 (+/− $5,714) for females. The per capita income for the borough was $32,822 (+/− $3,260). About 5.0% of families and 8.2% of the population were below the poverty line, including 11.0% of those under age 18 and 6.3% of those age 65 or over.

Census 2000
As of the 2000 United States Census there were 8,258 people, 2,448 households, and 1,860 families residing in the borough. The population density was 2,859.9 people per square mile (1,103.3/km2). There were 2,535 housing units at an average density of 877.9 per square mile (338.7/km2). The racial makeup of the borough was 94.22% White, 2.23% African American, 0.07% Native American, 1.21% Asian, 0.04% Pacific Islander, 0.50% from other races, and 1.73% from two or more races. Hispanic or Latino of any race were 2.92% of the population.

There were 2,448 households, out of which 35.5% had children under the age of 18 living with them, 64.9% were married couples living together, 8.6% had a female householder with no husband present, and 24.0% were non-families. 21.3% of all households were made up of individuals, and 13.3% had someone living alone who was 65 years of age or older. The average household size was 2.77 and the average family size was 3.25.

In the borough the population was spread out, with 21.8% under the age of 18, 22.1% from 18 to 24, 21.1% from 25 to 44, 20.4% from 45 to 64, and 14.6% who were 65 years of age or older. The median age was 34 years. For every 100 females, there were 87.6 males. For every 100 females age 18 and over, there were 84.7 males.

The median income for a household in the borough was $71,852, and the median income for a family was $80,127. Males had a median income of $59,638 versus $34,000 for females. The per capita income for the borough was $27,651. About 3.1% of families and 4.5% of the population were below the poverty line, including 7.0% of those under age 18 and 3.2% of those age 65 or over.

Government

Local government

West Long Branch is governed under the Borough form of New Jersey municipal government, which is used in 218 municipalities (of the 564) statewide, making it the most common form of government in New Jersey. The governing body is comprised of the Mayor and the Borough Council, with all positions elected at-large on a partisan basis as part of the November general election. The Mayor is elected directly by the voters to a four-year term of office. The Borough Council is comprised of six members elected to serve three-year terms on a staggered basis, with two seats coming up for election each year in a three-year cycle. The Borough form of government used by West Long Branch is a "weak mayor / strong council" government in which council members act as the legislative body with the mayor presiding at meetings and voting only in the event of a tie. The mayor can veto ordinances subject to an override by a two-thirds majority vote of the council. The mayor makes committee and liaison assignments for council members, and most appointments are made by the mayor with the advice and consent of the council.

, the Mayor of the Borough of West Long Branch is Republican Janet W. Tucci, who was first elected as mayor in 2005, and whose current term of office ends December 31, 2022. Members of the West Long Branch Borough Council are Stephen A. Bray (R, 2022), Steven Cioffi (R, 2024), MaryLynn Mango (R, 2022), Christopher M. Neyhart (R, 2023), John M. Penta Jr. (R, 2024) and Matthew Sniffen (R, 2023).

Police department
The West Long Branch Police Department is responsible for law and traffic enforcement in the Borough of West Long Branch. Its current Chief is Paul Habermann.

The Department has two divisions, Operations and Investigations.  The Operations Division consists of Patrol, Traffic, Dispatch, Firearms, Records and Special Services.  The Investigations Division is responsible for all criminal investigations.

Federal, state and county representation
West Long Branch is located in the 6th Congressional District and is part of New Jersey's 11th state legislative district.

 

Monmouth County is governed by a Board of County Commissioners comprised of five members who are elected at-large to serve three year terms of office on a staggered basis, with either one or two seats up for election each year as part of the November general election. At an annual reorganization meeting held in the beginning of January, the board selects one of its members to serve as director and another as deputy director. , Monmouth County's Commissioners are
Commissioner Director Thomas A. Arnone (R, Neptune City, term as commissioner and as director ends December 31, 2022), 
Commissioner Deputy Director Susan M. Kiley (R, Hazlet Township, term as commissioner ends December 31, 2024; term as deputy commissioner director ends 2022),
Lillian G. Burry (R, Colts Neck Township, 2023),
Nick DiRocco (R, Wall Township, 2022), and 
Ross F. Licitra (R, Marlboro Township, 2023). 
Constitutional officers elected on a countywide basis are
County clerk Christine Giordano Hanlon (R, 2025; Ocean Township), 
Sheriff Shaun Golden (R, 2022; Howell Township) and 
Surrogate Rosemarie D. Peters (R, 2026; Middletown Township).

Politics
As of March 23, 2011, there were a total of 4,862 registered voters in West Long Branch, of which 1,189 (24.5%) were registered as Democrats, 1,049 (21.6%) were registered as Republicans and 2,622 (53.9%) were registered as Unaffiliated. There were 2 voters registered as either Libertarians or Greens.

In the 2012 presidential election, Republican Mitt Romney received 57.6% of the vote (2,029 cast), ahead of Democrat Barack Obama with 41.5% (1,461 votes), and other candidates with 0.9% (31 votes), among the 3,548 ballots cast by the borough's 5,079 registered voters (27 ballots were spoiled), for a turnout of 69.9%. In the 2008 presidential election, Republican John McCain received 57.4% of the vote (2,208 cast), ahead of Democrat Barack Obama with 39.6% (1,524 votes) and other candidates with 1.2% (47 votes), among the 3,844 ballots cast by the borough's 5,065 registered voters, for a turnout of 75.9%. In the 2004 presidential election, Republican George W. Bush received 57.4% of the vote (2,202 ballots cast), outpolling Democrat John Kerry with 41.1% (1,574 votes) and other candidates with 0.8% (38 votes), among the 3,833 ballots cast by the borough's 4,926 registered voters, for a turnout percentage of 77.8.

In the 2013 gubernatorial election, Republican Chris Christie received 72.7% of the vote (1,612 cast), ahead of Democrat Barbara Buono with 25.8% (573 votes), and other candidates with 1.4% (32 votes), among the 2,246 ballots cast by the borough's 5,068 registered voters (29 ballots were spoiled), for a turnout of 44.3%. In the 2009 gubernatorial election, Republican Chris Christie received 63.1% of the vote (1,732 ballots cast), ahead of Democrat Jon Corzine with 28.9% (794 votes), Independent Chris Daggett with 6.4% (176 votes) and other candidates with 0.7% (18 votes), among the 2,743 ballots cast by the borough's 4,872 registered voters, yielding a 56.3% turnout.

Education

The West Long Branch Public Schools serves students in pre-kindergarten through eighth grade from West Long Branch. Students from Allenhurst, Interlaken and Loch Arbour attend the district's school as part of sending/receiving relationships, in which students attend on a tuition basis. As of the 2020–21 school year, the district, comprised of two schools, had an enrollment of 571 students and 65.5 classroom teachers (on an FTE basis), for a student–teacher ratio of 8.7:1. Schools in the district (with 2020–21 enrollment data from the National Center for Education Statistics) are 
Betty McElmon Elementary School with 319 students in pre-Kindergarten through fourth grade and
Frank Antonides School with 243 students in fifth through eighth grades.

For ninth through twelfth grades, public school students attend Shore Regional High School, a regional high school located in West Long Branch that also serves students from the constituent districts of Monmouth Beach, Oceanport and Sea Bright. As of the 2020–21 school year, the high school had an enrollment of 609 students and 54.1 classroom teachers (on an FTE basis), for a student–teacher ratio of 11.3:1. Seats on the board of education for the high school district are allocated based on the population of the constituent municipalities, with four of the nine seats assigned to West Long Branch.

Established in 1933, Monmouth University is a four-year private university on a  campus, with 5,600 students and 232 full-time faculty. The campus is notable for the Great Hall at Shadow Lawn, a National Historic Landmark that was used in the 1982 film Annie.

Transportation

Roads and highways

Route 36 and Route 71 intersect in the borough.

Public transportation
NJ Transit provides local bus service on the 831 and 837 routes. The nearest train service is available at the Long Branch station on the North Jersey Coast Line.

Notable people

People who were born in, residents of, or otherwise closely associated with West Long Branch include:
 Jake Areman (born 1996), soccer player who plays for the Tampa Bay Rowdies in the USL Championship.
 Holly Black (born 1971), author of the Spiderwick series of books
 Chester Bowman (1901–1936), sprinter who competed in the 1924 Summer Olympics
 Bessie Clayton (–1948), toe-tap dancer
 Stephen Donaldson (1946–1996), LGBT rights and prison reform activist
 Clarkson Sherman Fisher (1921–1997), federal judge who served as a councilmember in West Long Branch and later as Chief Judge of the United States District Court for the District of New Jersey
 Jon Herington (born 1954), jazz guitarist
 Steve Holeman (born 1967), head coach of the Lamar Lady Cardinals soccer team
 Hubert T. Parson (1872–1940), businessman who served as president of the F. W. Woolworth Company
 Elise Primavera (born 1955), author and illustrator of children's books, including The Secret Order of the Gumm Street Girls
 Arthur Pryor (1870–1942), trombone virtuoso, bandleader, and soloist with the Sousa Band who was a prolific composer of band music, best known for "The Whistler and His Dog"
 T. M. Stevens (born 1951), bassist
 Jordan Woolley (born 1981), actor
 Jimmy Zoppi (born 1954), musician and voice actor

Climate

References

External links

 Borough of West Long Branch official website

 
1908 establishments in New Jersey
Borough form of New Jersey government
Boroughs in Monmouth County, New Jersey
Populated places established in 1908